The  is a tram network located in Sapporo, Hokkaidō, Japan. It is operated by the Sapporo City Transportation Bureau. The Transportation Bureau took over the network in 1927.

Lines and routes
At its peak in 1958, the network was 25 kilometers in length with 11 lines and 7 routes. However, the network shrank due to increased automobile ownership and the opening of the Sapporo Municipal Subway.

After the closures in the 1970s, three lines remained.
: Nishi-Yon-Chōme – Nishi-Jūgo-Chōme
: Nishi-Jūgo-Chōme – Chūō-Toshokan-Mae
: Chūō-Toshokan-Mae – Susukino

Almost all trams run the full circle line, with several trams running between Nishi-Yon-Chōme and Nishisen-Jūroku-Jō during the morning rush hours.
Trams run at a frequency of 7 to 8 minutes during the day and 3 minutes during weekday peak periods between Nishi-Yon-Chōme and Nishisen-Jūroku-Jō stations.
Vehicles are taken out of service at Chūō-Toshokan-Mae.

The fare is ¥200. Like the subway, the tram accepts the SAPICA card, a prepaid magnetic card. Any other electronic IC cards (like Kitaca or Suica) can also be used.

Stations
All stations are located in Chūō-ku, Sapporo.

See also
Sapporo Municipal Subway
Sapporo City Transportation Bureau
List of tram and light rail transit systems

References

External links

  
 Official English Website
 Sapporo Public Transport Information 

Tram transport in Japan
Streetcar
600 V DC railway electrification
Sapporo